A pyrotechnic colorant is a chemical compound which causes a flame to burn with a particular color. These are used to create the colors in pyrotechnic compositions like fireworks and colored fires. The color-producing species are usually created from other chemicals during the reaction. Metal salts are commonly used; elemental metals are used rarely (e.g. copper for blue flames).

The color of the flame is dependent on the metal cation; the anion of the salt has very little direct influence. The anions however influence the flame temperature, both by increasing it (e.g. nitrates, chlorates) and decreasing it (e.g. carbonates, oxalates), indirectly influencing the flame brightness and brilliancy. For temperature-decreasing additives, the limit of colorant may be about 10–20 wt.% of the composition.

Some common examples are:

Radiating species
Despite the wide numbers of metal ion donors, they serve to form only a few atomic and molecular species that are useful as light emitters.

In many cases, chlorine donors have to be added in order to achieve sufficiently deep colors, as the desired emitting molecules have to be generated.

Some color emitters are of atomic nature (e.g. lithium, sodium). Presence of chlorine, and the reaction to monochlorides, may actually impair their color purity or intensity.

At high temperatures, the atoms will ionize. The emission spectra of ions are different than of neutral atoms; the ions may emit in undesired spectral ranges. For example, Ba+ emits in blue wavelengths. Ionization can be suppressed by addition of an easier-to-ionize metal with weak visible emission of its own, e.g. potassium; the potassium atoms then act as electron donors, neutralizing the barium ions.

The color blue is notoriously difficult to produce in fireworks, as the copper compounds need to be heated at a specific temperature for the optimal shade of blue to be produced. Thus, a deep, rich blue is usually viewed as the mark of an experienced fireworks maker.

Care should be taken to avoid formation of solid particles in the flame zone, whether metal oxides or carbon; incandescent solid particles emit black-body radiation that causes "washing out" of the colors. Addition of aluminium raises the flame temperature but also leads to formation of solid incandescent particles of aluminium oxide and molten aluminium. Magnesium has less such effect and is therefore more suitable for colored flames; it is more volatile than aluminium and more likely to be present as vapors than as particulates. Formation of solid particles of magnesium oxide can further be inhibited by presence of carbon monoxide, either by negative oxygen balance of the composition in presence of organic fuels, or by addition of the colorant in the form of an oxalate, which decomposes to carbon dioxide and carbon monoxide; the carbon monoxide reacts with the magnesium oxide particles to gaseous magnesium and gaseous carbon dioxide.

References